Twist and Shout is the first UK extended play by the English rock band the Beatles, released by Parlophone (catalogue number GEP 8882) on 12 July 1963. It was also released in Germany, Spain, New Zealand, Australia and Argentina. It topped the UK EP chart for twenty-one weeks, becoming so successful that it registered on the singles chart and eventually ranked as the fourth-bestselling "single" of 1963 in Britain. All four tracks on the EP were originally released on the band's debut album that year, Please Please Me. 

The previous year, an EP entitled  was released in France, credited to Tony Sheridan and featuring the Beatles (with Pete Best). It contained "Cry for a Shadow", the Beatles' first original composition ever to be put on a commercially available record.

Track listing

UK EP sales chart performance
Entry Date : 20 July 1963
Highest Position : 1 (for 21 weeks)
Weeks in Chart : 64 Weeks

See also
Twist and Shout album

References

External links
 Murashev.com

The Beatles EPs
Albums produced by George Martin
1963 debut EPs
Parlophone EPs